Kevin Charles Rader (born April 26, 1995) is an American football tight end for the Tennessee Titans of the National Football League (NFL). He played college football at Youngstown State.

Professional career

Green Bay Packers
Rader was signed by the Green Bay Packers as an undrafted free agent following the 2018 NFL Draft on May 4, 2018. He was waived on August 31, 2018, during final roster cuts.

Pittsburgh Steelers
Rader was signed by the Pittsburgh Steelers to a reserve/futures contract on January 9, 2019. He was waived at the end of training camp, but was signed to the Steelers' practice squad on September 1, 2019. He was released from the practice squad twice during the 2019 season, but was re-signed shortly afterwards both times. Rader signed a reserve/futures contract with the team on December 30, 2019.

Rader was waived during final roster cuts again on September 5, 2020, and re-signed to the team's practice squad the next day. He was signed to the active roster on November 24, 2020. He was waived on December 21, and re-signed to the practice squad two days later. He was elevated to the active roster on January 2 and January 9, 2021, for the team's week 17 and wild card playoff games, each against the Cleveland Browns, and reverted to the practice squad after each game. He made his NFL debut in week 17. On January 14, 2021, Rader signed a reserve/futures contract with the Steelers.

On August 31, 2021, Rader was waived by the Steelers as part of final roster cuts and re-signed to the practice squad the next day. He was promoted to the active roster on November 23, 2021.

On August 30, 2022, Rader was waived by the Steelers.

Tennessee Titans
On September 1, 2022, Rader was signed to the Tennessee Titans practice squad. He was promoted to the active roster on September 22.

References

External links
Pittsburgh Steelers bio
Youngstown State Penguins bio

1995 births
Living people
Players of American football from Pennsylvania
American football tight ends
Pine-Richland High School alumni
Youngstown State Penguins football players
Pittsburgh Steelers players
Tennessee Titans players